Bradford is a small town located near the former gold mining town of Maldon, Victoria.

History 
A railway station known as Pollard once served the town with passenger and goods trains. The last service ran on 15 January 1969.

References

External links

Towns in Victoria (Australia)